Francisco Ortiz de Vergara (1524 in Seville – 2 December 1574 in Ciudad Zaratina) was a Spanish conquistador and colonizer.

He succeeded Gonzalo de Mendoza as governor of Rio de la Plata. He was elected, rather than appointed by the king or his predecessor. His election was confirmed by bishop Pedro de la Torre, but he was demoted by the Royal Audience and returned to Spain in 1565 following charges by Nuño de Chaves.

During his administration, there were a number of failed attempts at new settlements - Sancti Spiritus, San Francisco, and Santa Cruz de la Sierra. This last, in the southern Amazon Basin, was eventually successful, but only after the city had been moved over 200 kilometers from site chosen by Chaves. The former location is in the vicinity of San José de Chiquitos and is now an archaeological site under the name Santa Cruz la Vieja.

References

Spanish conquistadors
1524 births
1574 deaths
People of the Viceroyalty of the Río de la Plata
People from Seville
16th century in the Viceroyalty of Peru
16th-century Spanish people
16th-century explorers
Governors of the Río de la Plata